Yevgeny Kuzin (born 9 July 1948) is a Russian equestrian. He competed in two events at the 1968 Summer Olympics.

References

1948 births
Living people
Russian male equestrians
Soviet male equestrians
Olympic equestrians of the Soviet Union
Equestrians at the 1968 Summer Olympics
Sportspeople from Moscow